
Year 303 (CCCIII) was a common year starting on Friday (link will display the full calendar) of the Julian calendar. It was known in the Roman Empire as the Year of the Consulship of Diocletian and Maximian (or, less frequently, year 1056 Ab urbe condita). The denomination 303 for this year has been used since the early medieval period, when the Anno Domini calendar era became the prevalent method in Europe for naming years.

Events

By place

Roman Empire 
 Great Persecution: Emperor Diocletian launches the last and largest major persecution of Christians in the Empire. Caesar Galerius and Hierocles are said to have been the instigators. In a series of four edicts published from February 23, 303, to 304, the Christians are forbidden to worship in groups, are made to perform sacrifices, and must surrender sacred texts. Churches are destroyed, and the clergy are arrested en masse. The persecution lasts in some parts of the empire until 313, and thousands of Christians are killed. Those put to death include Agnes of Rome, a 12-year-old Christian girl who has refused marriage and consecrated her virginity to God. Hailed as a martyr, she will be honored as the patron saint of chastity, gardeners, rape victims and virgins.
 September 25 – On a voyage preaching the gospel, Saint Fermin of Pamplona is beheaded in Amiens, France.
 November 20 – The Augusti Diocletian and Maximian reunite in Rome to celebrate the 20th anniversary of Diocletian's accession, which is now treated as a joint anniversary for both emperors. A series of columns in the Roman Forum and a triumphal arch are dedicated to the emperors. The two emperors also agree on a plan of abdication.
 Galerius wins his third victory over the Carpi and is perhaps joined on campaign by Diocletian. The Arch of Galerius is dedicated in Thessaloniki.
 Caesar Constantius I wins a victory over Germanic invaders in the battle of Vindonissa.

Armenia 
 Etchmiadzin Cathedral is completed by Gregory the Illuminator and Tiridates III, king of Armenia.
 January 6 – Baptism of Tiridates III of Armenia.

America 
 In Mexico, the civilization of Teotihuacan flourishes.

By topic

Religion 
 March 4 – Adrian and Natalia of Nicomedia are martyred.

Births 
 Magnentius, Roman usurper (d. 353)
 Wang Xizhi, Chinese calligrapher (d. 361)
 Xun Guan, Chinese warrior and general

Deaths 

 April 23 – George of Lydda, Roman soldier and martyr
 Acacius of Byzantium, Roman centurion and martyr
 Anthimus of Rome, Christian priest and martyr
 Cao Huan, Chinese emperor of Cao Wei (b. 246)
 Cessianus, Christian child martyr
 Crescentinus, Roman soldier and martyr
 Cyriacus, Roman nobleman and martyr
 Devota, Corsican woman and martyr
 Erasmus of Formiae, Christian martyr
 Expeditus, Roman centurion and martyr
 Felix and Adauctus, Christian martyrs
 Fermin, Christian bishop and martyr
 Lu Ji, Chinese general and writer (b. 261)
 Li Liu, Chinese spiritual leader (b. 248)
 Li Te (or Xuanxiu), Chinese general
 Pantaleon, Christian wonderworker and martyr
 Romanus of Caesarea, Christian martyr 
 Victor Maurus ("the Moor"), Christian martyr
 Vitus (or Guido), Christian martyr

References